This is a list of the highest-grossing independent films. The Passion of the Christ is the highest-grossing independent film of all time as well as adjusted for inflation. Independent films such as Inglorious Basterds and Paranormal Activity, were co-distributed by the major film studios, which was not included.

Top highest-grossing independent films

Highest-grossing films adjusted for inflation

See also 

 List of highest-grossing films
 List of highest-grossing R-rated films

References 

Lists of highest-grossing films
Independent films